The 2012 Sydney to Hobart Yacht Race, sponsored by Rolex and hosted by the Cruising Yacht Club of Australia in Sydney, New South Wales, was the 68th annual running of the "blue water classic" Sydney to Hobart Yacht Race. The 2012 race began on Sydney Harbour, at 1pm on Boxing Day (26 December 2012), before heading south for  through the Tasman Sea, past Bass Strait, into Storm Bay and up the River Derwent, to cross the finish line in Hobart, Tasmania.

76 competitors started the race and 71 finished. Line honors were claimed by Wild Oats XI, who broke their own race record, to finish in 1 day, 18 hours 23 minutes and 12 seconds. They defeated their nearest challenger, Ragamuffin Loyal, by around 5 hours.

Results

Line honours (first 10)

Handicap results (Top 10)

References

Sydney to Hobart Yacht Race
Sydney
Sydney
December 2012 sports events in Australia